The 1937 Akron Zippers football team was an American football team that represented the University of Akron as an independent during the 1937 college football season. In their second season under head coach Jim Aiken, the Zips compiled a 7–2 record and outscored opponents by a total of 139 to 53. William Sturgeon was the team captain.

Schedule

References

Akron
Akron Zips football seasons
Akron Zippers football